Purple Mountain may refer to:

China
 Purple Mountain (Nanjing), a mountain in Nanjing, Jiangsu

Ireland
 Purple Mountain (Kerry), a mountain in County Kerry

United States

 Purple Mountain (Alaska), a mountain in Alaska
 Purple Peak (Colorado), a mountain in Colorado 
 Purple Mountain (Oregon), a mountain in Oregon 
 Purple Mountain (Washington), a mountain in Washington 
 Purple Mountain (Wyoming), a mountain in Yellowstone National Park, Wyoming

See also
 Purple Mountains, an American indie rock band